"Heart in Danger" is the debut single by Australian pop-rock band Southern Sons, released in August 1990. It was written by the group's guitarist, Phil Buckle, and produced by Ross Fraser. The song peaked at number five in Australia and was included on their debut album, Southern Sons (1990).

Background 
Southern Sons were established in 1989 by all four members of the group the State, Peter Bowman on guitars and vocals, Phil Buckle on vocals and guitar, Geoff Cain on bass guitar and Virgil Donati on drums, which were joined by guitarist and vocalist Irwin Thomas ( Jack Jones).

In August 1990, Southern Sons released their debut single "Heart in Danger", which peaked at number five on the ARIA Singles Chart. It was written by Buckle and produced by Ross Fraser. It was followed by the single, "Always and Ever" (November) and the group's debut self-titled album, Southern Sons (February 1991), which peaked at number five on the ARIA albums chart.

Southern Sons were criticised for sounding too similar to label-mate John Farnham; they "had to defend their sound, their image, their music but now say they're just happy doing what they do in their own time and way." Buckle "believes that despite the fact he writes music for both groups... the Sons guitar work makes for a harder sound." According to Victor Harbor Times reviewer the album is a "mature and stylish collection of emotionally charged and musically impeccable pop/rock songs."

Track listings

Charts

Weekly charts

Year-end charts

Sales and certifications

References

External links
 "Heart in Danger" by Southern Sons at Discogs

1990 songs
1990 debut singles
Southern Sons songs
APRA Award winners
RCA Records singles
Songs written by Phil Buckle